Juvenile Hell is the debut studio album by American hip hop duo Mobb Deep. It was recorded when they were still in their late teens and released on April 13, 1993 through 4th & B'way Records. Juvenile Hell was recorded between 1992-1993 and features production from DJ Premier & Large Professor. The album produced the two singles Peer Pressure & Hit It from the Back. Upon its release the album failed to chart and shortly  after the duo was dropped from their label.

Track listing

Singles chart positions

References

Mobb Deep albums
4th & B'way Records albums
1993 debut albums
Albums produced by DJ Premier
Albums produced by Large Professor
Albums produced by Havoc (musician)